The Journal of Integrative Neuroscience is a peer-reviewed scientific journal of neuroscience. It was published by World Scientific from 2002 to 2016, then IOS Press in 2017, and is now published by IMR Press since 2018. The editor-in-chief is Gernot Riedel (University of Aberdeen).

In February 2022 the journal was included in the Norwegian Scientific Index of possibly predatory journals, known as level X.

Abstracting and indexing
The journal is abstracted and indexed in:

According to the Journal Citation Reports, the journal has a 2021 impact factor of 1.664.

References

External links

English-language journals
Publications established in 2002
Neuroscience journals
Quarterly journals
Creative Commons Attribution-licensed journals